Maarten Rudelsheim (25 April 1873 in Amsterdam – 10 September 1920 in Antwerp) was a flamingant of Jewish-Dutch descent.

Rudelsheim was born in the Netherlands, of a Jewish father and a Dutch mother. In 1885, the family came to Antwerp. Maarten Rudelsheim studied at Ghent University and became Doctor of German philology. In 1898, Maarten Rudelsheim was naturalized as a Belgian citizen. In 1900, he became assistant librarian in Antwerp. He devoted himself to the Dutchification of Ghent University, then still a French-speaking university in a Flemish city. After the war, Rudelsheim was condemned to ten years' imprisonment for involvement in activism during the war. He died in Antwerp prison.

Sources
 Rudelsheim’s biography

1873 births
1920 deaths
Dutch Jews
Flemish activists
People from Amsterdam
Ghent University alumni